Musōyama Masashi (born February 14, 1972 as Takehito Oso) is a former sumo wrestler from Mito, Ibaraki, Japan. A former amateur champion, he turned professional in January 1993, and he won promotion to the top makuuchi division in just four tournaments. He won thirteen special prizes and spent a total of 31 tournaments at komusubi and sekiwake before finally reaching the second highest rank of ōzeki in 2000, shortly after winning his only top division tournament championship or yūshō. He retired in 2004. He is now the head coach of Fujishima stable.

Early career
Oso was interested in sumo from a young age, as his father was the director of the Ibaraki Prefecture sumo association. He won national amateur titles at high school and at Senshu University, where he was a rival of Tosanoumi. He made his professional debut in January 1993 in the third makushita division, as due to his amateur achievements he had been given makushita tsukedashi status. He breezed through makushita undefeated with two consecutive 7–0 scores to earn promotion to the second jūryō division, whereupon he changed his shikona from Oso to Musōyama, meaning "twin warrior mountain." He made his debut in the top makuuchi division in September 1993. It took him only seven tournaments from his professional debut to make the san'yaku ranks, debuting at sekiwake in March 1994. In September he won his first eleven matches, finishing as runner up to Takanohana with a fine 13–2 record. Over the next few years he was regularly ranked at either sekiwake or komusubi, but was unable to make the next step up. He suffered a number of injuries, including a dislocated shoulder and a persistent problem with his left big toe which affected his speed of movement.

Ōzeki career
In January 2000 Musōyama won his first top division yūshō or tournament championship with a score of 13–2, finishing one win ahead of Takanohana whom he had defeated earlier in the tournament. He followed up with a 12–3 score in March, his second runner-up performance, which earned him promotion to ōzeki. He missed the whole of his debut ōzeki tournament through injury and could manage only a 4–11 record on his return, resulting in demotion back to sekiwake. However he scored ten wins in the September 2000 tournament, which immediately restored him to ōzeki status. His time at ōzeki was bedeviled by further injuries which meant he was often merely struggling to maintain his rank instead of challenging for tournament championships and further promotion. His best performance as an ōzeki was a 12–3 runner-up score in March 2001, but that was the only tournament in which he was able to win more than ten bouts. On the 6th day of the May 2001 tournament he had a match with Kotomitsuki that lasted a total of nine minutes and 17 seconds. After two breaks, the match was eventually called off and rescheduled for later in the day, the first time this had happened in the top division since 1978. Musōyama lost the rearranged match. The last tournament in which he managed a score in double figures was in July 2003. After pulling out of the September 2004 tournament with only two wins he lost his first three matches in November and announced his retirement, at the age of 32.

After retirement
Musōyama remained in sumo as a coach at his stable and is now known as Fujishima-oyakata. In September 2010 he took over as the head coach and changed its name to Fujishima stable. As of 2022 the stable has one sekitori wrestler, Bushozan.

In January 2015 Musōyama was named deputy director of the Refereeing Department, and as a result was one of the chief judges to adjudicate sumo matches. He held this position until March 2022, but since then he has had to fill in as a chief judge on several occasions.

Fighting style
He was mainly a oshi-sumo wrestler, preferring pushing and thrusting techniques. His most common winning kimarite was oshi-dashi, a simple push out. However, he was also capable of fighting on the mawashi, his favoured grip being hidari-yotsu (right hand outside, left hand inside).

Career record

See also
List of sumo tournament top division champions
List of sumo tournament top division runners-up
Glossary of sumo terms
List of past sumo wrestlers
List of sumo elders
List of ōzeki

References

External links

1972 births
Living people
Japanese sumo wrestlers
Ōzeki
People from Mito, Ibaraki
Senshu University alumni
Sumo people from Ibaraki Prefecture